Aylesbury War Memorial is located in Market Square, Aylesbury, Buckinghamshire, England. It is a grade II listed building with Historic England.

References

Grade II listed monuments and memorials
Grade II listed buildings in Buckinghamshire
British military memorials and cemeteries
War memorials in the United Kingdom